Long Jack Phillipus Tjakamarra (c. 1932  – 2020) was a Ngalia/Warlpiri man  (a Western desert man) and a founding member of the  Papunya Tula cooperative.

In a 1999 catalogue for the exhibition Twenty-five years and beyond, he said:I am still painting. Still holding my country.

Collections 
His works are held in: 

 the Museum and Art Gallery of the Northern Territory (21 works, including Water and lightning story at Pulinganu 1971 and Honey Ant story 1971)
 Te Papa Tongarewa (2 works, Fire dreaming at Parikulaman and Water dreaming at Kalipinpa)
 the National Museum of Australia (2 works, Wilkinkarra men's camp 1975 and Making spears 1975)
 the National Gallery of Australia (4 works including Snake story 1973 and Water course)
 the National Gallery of Victoria (3 works including  Emu dreaming and Possum man and possum woman travelling)
 the Art Gallery of South Australia (2 works Water dreaming 1987 and Widow's dreaming 1971)

References 

Australian Aboriginal artists
20th-century Australian artists
1930s births
2020 deaths